Bremen Island is a  or  uninhabited island, part of the Melchior Islands in the Southern Ocean along the west coast of the Antarctic Peninsula.

The existence of the channel was discovered during a zodiac excursion on 2 February 2003 by the German cruise ship MS Bremen, named after the German city of Bremen. The name "Bremen Island" was proposed by Bärbel Krämer of Hapag-Lloyd.

See also 
 Composite Antarctic Gazetteer
 List of Antarctic islands south of 60° S
 SCAR
 Territorial claims in Antarctica

References

External links
New German-language names proposals

Islands of the Palmer Archipelago